The Battle of Mechain was fought in Powys, Wales, in 1070, for rule of the Welsh kingdoms of Gwynedd and Powys. A written account is included in the Brut y Tywysogion, the medieval Welsh chronicle of the princes. It is also referred to in the work of medieval poets such as Lewys Glyn Cothi.

After the murder of Gruffydd ap Llywelyn, Harold Godwinson married his widow Ealdgyth and divided Gruffydd's realm into the traditional kingdoms of Gwynedd and Powys, the rule of which were given to Bleddyn ap Cynfyn and his brother Rhiwallon ap Cynfyn. Gruffydd left two sons Maredudd and Idwalwho in 1070 challenged Bleddyn and Rhiwallon at Mechain in an attempt to win back part of their father's kingdom.  However, both sons were defeated, Idwal (or Ithel) being killed in combat and Maredudd dying of exposure after the battle.

Rhiwallon was also killed in this battle, leaving Bleddyn to rule Gwynedd and Powys alone.

References

External links

Mechain
11th century in Wales
History of Powys
Mechain
History of Gwynedd
1067 in Europe